The men's road race at the 1984 UCI Road World Championships was the 51st edition of the event. The race took place on Sunday 2 September 1984 in Barcelona, Spain. The race was won by Claude Criquielion of Belgium.

Final classification

References

Men's Road Race
UCI Road World Championships – Men's road race
1984 Super Prestige Pernod International